Harvey Jeremiah Peeler House, also known as Lady's Funeral Home, is a historic home located at Kannapolis, Cabarrus County, North Carolina. It was built in 1923, and is two-story, American Craftsman / Colonial Revival style brick house with a hipped roof.  It features a one-story wraparound front porch with two formal entrances.  Also on the property is a contributing garage. In 1950 the house was leased to Lady's Funeral Home, which operated there until 1968.

It was listed on the National Register of Historic Places in 2007.

References

Houses on the National Register of Historic Places in North Carolina
Colonial Revival architecture in North Carolina
Houses completed in 1923
Houses in Cabarrus County, North Carolina
National Register of Historic Places in Cabarrus County, North Carolina